Tapsatella is a monotypic genus of South American jumping spiders containing the single species, Tapsatella albocastanea. It was placed in the tribe Aelurillini within the Salticoida clade of Salticinae. It was first described by G. D. Rubio, C. E. Stolar and M. F. Nadal in 2020, and is only known from Chaco Province, Argentina. It may be related to some species of Wedoquella and Phiale.

See also
 List of Salticidae genera

References

Monotypic Salticidae genera
Spiders of Argentina